Heinz Mayr (born 20 October 1935) is a former German racewalker, who competed for West Germany in the 1972 Summer Olympics.

He competed for the clubs Eintracht Braunschweig, TSV Salzgitter and VfL Wolfsburg. He won the national championship in the 50 kilometres race walk in 1961, as well as four German racewalking team championships with Eintracht Braunschweig (also in 1961), Salzgitter (in 1969) and Wolfsburg (in 1973 and 1974).

Mayr competed in the 20 kilometres race walk at the 1972 Summer Olympics in Munich, where he finished 13th.

Competition record

References 

1935 births
Living people
Sportspeople from Braunschweig
German male racewalkers
West German male racewalkers
German national athletics champions
Olympic athletes of West Germany
Athletes (track and field) at the 1972 Summer Olympics
Eintracht Braunschweig athletes
VfL Wolfsburg athletes